The Abinomn language (Avinomen, Foya) is a likely language isolate initially reported by Mark Donohue from Papua province, Indonesia. It is also known as Avinomen, Baso (deprecated), and Foia. There are about 300 speakers.

Classification
Abinomn is not closely related to any other language, and its closest relatives are unknown. It is generally treated as a language isolate.

Neighboring languages
Although surrounded by Lakes Plain languages, Abinomn highly differs from Lakes Plain. For instance, unlike the nearby Lakes Plain languages, Abinomn is a non-tonal language. Languages adjacent to Abinomn are:

Papasena (west)
Diebroud (south; across the Taritatu River)
Foau (east)
Berik (north)

Phonology
{| class="wikitable" style="text-align:center;"
|+ Consonants:
|-
! rowspan="2" colspan="2" | 
! rowspan="2" | Labial
! rowspan="2" | Alveolar
! rowspan="2" | Palatal
! colspan="2" | Velar
|-
! plain
! labial
|-
! colspan="2" | Nasal
| 
| 
| 
|
|
|-
! rowspan="2" | Plosive/Affricate
! 
|
| 
|
| 
| 
|-
! 
|
| 
| 
|
| 
|-
! rowspan="2" | Fricative
! 
| 
| 
|
|
|
|-
! 
| 
|
|
|
|
|-
! colspan="2" | Rhotic
|
| 
|
|
|
|-
! colspan="2" | Approximant
| 
|
| 
|
|
|}

Pronouns
The Abinomn pronouns are:

{| class="wikitable" 
|-
! colspan="2" | singular
! colspan="2" | dual
! colspan="2" | plural
|-
| I || mit || we || mor || we || awp
|-
| you (nominative) || ni || you two || por || you || pi
|-
| he, she || in, nn || they two || nar || they || kn
|}

Number inflection
Number inflection for selected Abinomn nouns showing suppletive forms, as listed in Foley (2018):

{| 
|+ Number inflection for selected Abinomn nouns
! gloss !! singular !! dual !! plural
|-
| ‘armband’ || atamatu || atamaturom || atamatukon
|-
| ‘aunt’ || nyebak || nyebakrom || nyebakaigon
|-
| ‘bamboo knife’ || abisiam || abissabrom || abisiasom
|-
| ‘barbed arrow’ || kari || karirom || karigon
|-
| ‘bandicoot’ || aine || ainerom || ainekon
|-
| ‘calf of leg’ || din || dirom || doidi
|-
| ‘cassowary’ || komosin || komosirom || komosidi
|-
| ‘catfish’ || mum || mubrum || mukr
|-
| ‘centipede’ || sm || sbrom || skr
|-
| ‘cockatoo’ || arkon || arkorom || arkoti
|-
| ‘comb’ || isr || isrdom || isrkon
|-
| ‘drum’ || itowa || itowarom || itowakon
|-
| ‘egg’ || ak || akrom || aigon
|-
| ‘father’s father’ || moi || moirom || moigon
|-
| ‘fireplace’ || msm || msbrom || mskr
|-
| ‘fishing arrow’ || den || derom || deti
|-
| ‘footwear’ || tefir || tefidom || tefirkon
|-
| ‘grasshopper’ || saseinakin || saseinakirom || saseinakidi
|-
| ‘hair’ || erk || erkrom || erkigon
|-
| ‘hand’ || akwir || akwidom || akwirkon
|-
| ‘headband’ || kwetam || kwetambrom || kwetakr
|-
| ‘house’ || pr || prdom || prkon
|-
| ‘jungle’ || gwek || gwekrom || gwekigon
|-
| ‘knife handle’ || tam || tabrom || tatom
|-
| ‘lake’ || kesif || kesifrom || kesifkon
|-
| ‘leech’ || piar || piardom || piarkom
|-
| ‘louse’ || jen || jendrom || jeti
|-
| ‘maleo fowl’ || igwuk || igwukrom || igwukigon
|-
| ‘night’ || siwi || siwirom || siwkon
|-
| ‘owl’ || weimn || weimrom || weimti
|-
| ‘pot’ || jek || jekrom || jekigon
|-
| ‘praying mantis’ || tigwere || tigwererom || tigwerekon
|-
| ‘prawn’ || beresmin || beresmindrom || beresmidi
|-
| ‘river turtle’ || fan || farom || fati
|-
| ‘sago pudding’ || midam || midabrom || midatom
|-
| ‘star’ || skin || skirom || skidi
|-
| ‘stone’ || wor || wordom || workon
|-
| ‘sunbird’ || weim || weibrom || weigr
|-
| ‘swamp’ || okwi || okwirom || okwigon
|-
| ‘thigh’ || ker || kedom || kerkon
|-
| ‘thorn’ || doin || doirom || doidi
|-
| ‘toe’ || gwesiam || gwesiabrom || gwesasom
|-
| ‘tree kangaroo’ || we || werom || wekon
|-
| ‘wallaby’ || dk || dkrom || digon
|-
| ‘water snake’ || moi || moirom || moigon
|-
| ‘younger brother’ || ai || airom || akon
|}

References

External links 
 Timothy Usher, New Guinea World, Abinomn
 OLAC resources in and about the Abinomn language

 
Language isolates of New Guinea
Papuan languages
Languages of western New Guinea